Miss International 1993, the 33rd Miss International pageant, was held on October 9, 1993 in Tokyo, Japan. Agnieszka Pachałko earned Poland's second Miss International crown.

Results

Placements

Contestants

  - Nazarena Vanesa González Almada
  - Monique Ann Lysaught
  - Silvia Kronbichler
  - Christelle Roelandts
  - Maria Cristina Tondelli
  - Tatiana Paula Alves
  - Claire Elizabeth Smith
  - Kathy Sáenz Herrera
  - Laura Odio Salas
  - Mette Marie Salto
  - Arlene Ulla Kaarina Kotala
  - Marie-Ange Noelle Contart
  - Katja Mordarski
  - Helena Christos Zabaka
  - Diana Galván
  - Theresa Victoria Tilley
  - Shirley Antoinette Bogaard
  - Miriam Liseth Zapata Godoy
  - Middy Yu Siu-Po
  - Pooja Batra
  - Deborah Hannigan
  - Anat Elimelech
  - Masayo Shibasaki
  - Chang Eun-young
  - Nathalie Dos Santos
  - Melissa Joanne Portelli
  - María Cristina Arcos Torres
  - Laure Denise Masson
  - Monique Lorraine Joel
  - Ida Patricia Delaney
  - Tayna Castro Belyeu
  - Ismenia Isabel Velásquez
  - Sheela Mae Capili Santarin
  - Agnieszka Pachalko
  - Anabela Pacheco Centeno
  - Brenda Esther Robles Cortés
  - Ilmira Shamsutdinova
  - Teri Su Lian Tan
  - Karin Majtánová
  - Ana Piedad Galván Malagón
  - Anna Hofvenstam
  - Chantal Hediger
  - Supasiri Payaksiri
  - Hande Kazanova
  - Nataliya Victorovna Romanenko
  - Lynette Jonene MacFee
  - Fabiola Mónica Rita Spitale Baiamonte

1993
1993 in Tokyo
1993 beauty pageants
Beauty pageants in Japan